How the Steel Was Tempered is a 1942 Soviet drama film directed by Mark Donskoy.

Plot 
The film is based on the eponymous novel by Nikolai Ostrovsky.

Starring 

 V. Perest-Petrenko as Pavel Korchagin
 Irina Fedotova as Tonya
 Daniil Sagal as Zhukhrai - Sailor
 Nikolai Bubnov as Artem Korchagin (as N. Bubnov)
 Aleksandr Khvylya as Dolinnik
 Boris Runge as Serezhka
 Vladimir Balashov as Victor Leschinsky
 Wladyslaw Krasnowiecki as German Officer (as V. Krasnovitsky)
 Anton Dunajsky as Ukrainian Interpreter
 Nikolai Voloshin

References

External links 
 

Nikolai Ostrovsky
1940s Russian-language films
Soviet drama films
Soviet black-and-white films
1942 drama films
1942 films